Walter Iuzzolino (born 1968) is an Italian television producer, the titular Walter in Walter Presents. He is known for producing UK television shows including The Undateables and My Big Fat Fetish.

Walter Iuzzolino was born in Genoa in 1968, and has had a lifelong interest in film and television drama.

Iuzzolino is responsible for selecting the content for the Walter Presents range of foreign-language TV drama series on the UK's Channel 4 free streaming service.

References

1968 births
Italian television producers
Living people
Mass media people from Genoa